Ripke "Rip" Reukema (April 23, 1857September 17, 1917) was a Dutch American lawyer and Republican politician from Milwaukee, Wisconsin.  He was a member of the Wisconsin State Senate (1903) and State Assembly (1893).

Biography

Rip Reukema was born in Milwaukee, Wisconsin, to Dutch American immigrants.  He was educated in the Milwaukee Public Schools and went on to study law in the offices of Nathan Pereles and E. P. Smith. He would become a lawyer, being admitted to practice in open court upon examination March 7, 1881.  Reukema died on September 17, 1917, in Milwaukee.

Political career
Reukema was elected to the Wisconsin State Assembly in 1892, serving in the 1893 session.  A decade later, he won a 1902 special election to serve in the State Senate for the 1903 session, completing the term of William Devos, who had resigned to become collector of customs at the port of Milwaukee. He was a Republican. He was elected twice as Justice of the Peace. He served as director of the Milwaukee school board from 1897 to 1899, and member of the school board commission from 1901 to 1902. He was also the treasurer of the Milwaukee Bar Association, and director of the Citizens' Loan and Trust Company.

References

1857 births
1917 deaths
Politicians from Milwaukee
Republican Party Wisconsin state senators
Republican Party members of the Wisconsin State Assembly
Wisconsin lawyers
19th-century American politicians
20th-century American politicians
19th-century American lawyers